Bredagh GAC is a Gaelic Athletic Association club in County Down, Northern Ireland. It fields teams at all levels from U8 to Senior in Men's and Ladies Gaelic football, Hurling and Camogie. It had its previous pitch, Bredagh Park, taken off them in December 1998 but moved next door to Cherryvale Playing Fields, owned by the Belfast City Council.

Bredagh is one of the few clubs in Down without a pitch to call its own but it is a flourishing and resurgent club benefiting from both a changing demographic in the Ballynafeigh area and from solid work at increased training at underage levels.

In 2006, the footballers won the Down Junior Football Championship and the Hurlers won Division 3 of the Ulster Club Hurling League.

In 2007 the hurlers won the Down Junior Hurling Championship and Division 2 of the All County Hurling League - both for the first time.

In 2008 they won Antrim League Division 4B. At underage level they won the Division 1 (14s) and Division 2 (16s)Down Hurling Championship at U14 and U16.  The U14 Hurling team also won Division 1of the county league and the Division 1 Down Feile. They were also narrowly beaten in the final of the Division 2 All-Ireland Feile in Co.Clare.

In 2010 the hurlers won the Down Intermediate Hurling Championship for the first time along with Antrim League Division 4A.

In 2011 Bredagh Won The Down Junior Football Championship Beating Dromara 4.10 To 0.09 in the final.

2011 also saw Bredagh Senior Hurlers compete in the Down Senior Hurling Championship for the first time in the history of the club.

In 2012 Bredagh Senior Hurlers won the Down Junior Hurling Championship for the second time after re-structuring from the Down County Board saw them drop from Senior Championship to Junior.

The Senior Hurlers made history in October 2012 when they won the Ulster Junior Club Hurling Championship for the first time in the club's history beating Na Magha of Derry 4-18 to 3-07 at Casement Park.

The Senior Men's Footballers gained promotion to Down Division 2 in 2012.

2016 saw the Men's Footballers and men's hurlers both win their respective Intermediate Championships. The footballers achieved victory over An Riocht in Pairc Esler and the hurlers achieving victory over Ballycran in Newcastle. Also in 2016, the ladies footballers went on to win the Senior Championship wrh a victory over Castlewellen in Downpatrick.

2017 saw the men's footballers win the Down Intermediate Football Championship.

Current County Players
The following Bredagh players played inter-county level for Down for 2019 season.
 Senior Footballer 
 Conor Francis 
 Senior Hurlers
 Mark Patterson
 Joseph Hannrahan

See also
List of Gaelic Athletic Association clubs
An Riocht
Castlewellan GAC
Clonduff GAC
Kilcoo GAC
Longstone GAC
John Mitchel GFC
Newry Bosco GFC
Warrenpoint GAA

References

External links
Official Bredagh GAA Club website
Official An Riocht GAA Club website
Official Down County website

Gaelic games clubs in County Down
Gaelic football clubs in County Down
Hurling clubs in County Down